The 2016 MercedesCup was a men's tennis tournament played on grass courts. It was the 39th edition of the MercedesCup, and part of the ATP World Tour 250 series of the 2016 ATP World Tour. It was held at the Tennis Club Weissenhof in Stuttgart, Germany, from 6 June until 13 June 2016. Dominic Thiem won the singles title.

Singles main-draw entrants

Seeds 

 1 Rankings are as of May 23, 2016

Other entrants 
The following players received wildcards into the singles main draw:
  Michael Berrer
  Jan Choinski
  Juan Martín del Potro

The following players received entry from the qualifying draw:
  Fabrice Martin
  Florian Mayer
  Sergiy Stakhovsky
  Radek Štěpánek

Withdrawals 
Before the tournament
  Evgeny Donskoy →replaced by  Mikhail Youzhny
  Benoît Paire →replaced by  Sam Groth

Doubles main-draw entrants

Seeds 

 Rankings are as of May 23, 2016

Other entrants 
The following pairs received wildcards into the doubles main draw:
  Michael Berrer /  Jan-Lennard Struff
  Juan Martín del Potro /  Taylor Fritz

Finals

Singles 

  Dominic Thiem defeated  Philipp Kohlschreiber, 6–7(2–7), 6–4, 6–4

Doubles 

  Marcus Daniell /  Artem Sitak defeated  Oliver Marach /  Fabrice Martin, 6–7(4–7), 6–4, [10–8]

References

External links 
 
 ATP tournament profile

Stuttgart Open
Stuttgart Open
Stutt